Hesar Bon (also Romanized as Ḩeşār Bon) is a village in Hablerud Rural District of the Central District of Firuzkuh County, Tehran province, Iran. At the 2006 National Census, its population was 946 in 284 households. The following census in 2011 counted 550 people in 223 households. The latest census in 2016 showed a population of 439 people in 158 households; it was the largest village in its rural district.

References 

Firuzkuh County

Populated places in Tehran Province

Populated places in Firuzkuh County